Princess Taiping (lit. "Princess of Great Peace", personal name unknown, possibly Li Lingyue (李令月)) (after 662 – 2 August 713) was a royal princess and prominent political figure of the Tang dynasty and her mother Wu Zetian's Zhou dynasty. She was the youngest daughter of Wu Zetian and Emperor Gaozong and was influential during the reigns of her mother and her elder brothers Emperor Zhongzong and Emperor Ruizong (both of whom reigned twice), particularly during Emperor Ruizong's second reign, when for three years until her death, she was the real power behind the throne.

She is the most famous and influential princess of the Tang dynasty and possibly in the whole history of China thanks to her power, ability and ambition. She was involved in political difficulties and developments during the reigns of her mother and brothers. Indeed, after the coup against Empress Dowager Wei, she became the real ruler of Tang. During the reign of Emperor Ruizong, she was not restricted by anything, the emperor issued rulings based on her views and the courtiers and the military flattered her and majority from every civil and military class joined her faction, so her power exceeded that of the emperor.

Eventually, however, a rivalry developed between her and her nephew, Emperor Ruizong's son, Crown Prince Li Longji. Both of them were hostile in power-sharing and they fought for the monopoly over power. After Emperor Ruizong yielded the throne to Li Longji (as Emperor Xuanzong) in 712, the conflict came to the political forefront, and openly, the court became a manifestation of conspiracy rather than the administration of the empire; in 713, Emperor Xuanzong, according to historical records, believing that she was planning to overthrow him, acted first, executing a large number of her powerful allies and forcing her to commit suicide.

During Emperor Gaozong's reign: Under Empress Wu's shadow 
It is not known when Princess Taiping was born, but it is known that she was the youngest of the six known children of Emperor Gaozong and his second wife Empress Wu (later known as Wu Zetian). But it is clear that she was the same age as his brother Li Dan (later Emperor Ruizong) or younger, and at the time of her birth, her mother, Empress Wu, was the real power behind Emperor Gaozong, and Wu took control over Gaozong.  In 670, when Empress Wu's mother Lady Yang died, Empress Wu had Princess Taiping become a Taoist nun to gain divine favor on behalf of Lady Yang. During the Yifeng era (676-679), when Emperor Gaozong was negotiating a peace treaty with Tufan, the king of Tufan requested to marry Princess Taiping, Emperor Gaozong declined — and, as an excuse, built a Taoist temple named Taiping Temple (太平觀) and commissioned her as the abbess of the temple.

In 681, however, Emperor Gaozong and Empress Wu selected Xue Shao (薛紹), a son of Emperor Gaozong's sister Princess Chengyang and Princess Chengyang's second husband Xue Yao (薛曜) (and thus, Princess Taiping's cousin) to be Princess Taiping's husband.  A grand wedding was held in the fall of 681, and it was said that there were so many torches used in the procession from the palace to Xuanyang District (宣陽坊), where the Xue clan lived, that many trees on the sides of the streets died due to the heat and smoke. Empress Wu, believing that Lady Xiao, the wife of Xue Shao's brother Xue Yi (薛顗), and Lady Cheng, the wife of another brother Xue Xu (薛緒), were both of low birth and should not be her daughter's sisters-in-law, commented, "How can my daughter be a sister-in-law to the daughters of farmers?" She considered forcing Xue Yi and Xue Xu to divorce, but someone noted to her that Lady Xiao was a grandniece of the deceased chancellor Xiao Yu, and she relented. Xue Shao and Princess Taiping had two sons — Xue Chongxun (薛崇訓) and Xue Chongjian (薛崇簡) — and a daughter (686 - 710) who was created Lady Wanquan (萬泉縣主).

During Empress Dowager Wu's regency: Participate in politics
Emperor Gaozong died in 683 and was succeeded by Princess Taiping's older brother Crown Prince Li Zhe (as Emperor Zhongzong), but actual power was in the hands of Empress Wu, as empress dowager and regent.  In 684, when Emperor Zhongzong showed signs of independence, she deposed him and replaced him with another brother of Princess Taiping's, Li Dan, Prince of Yu (as Emperor Ruizong), but thereafter wielded power even more firmly. As she viewed Princess Taiping as similar to her in appearance and attitude, she favored Princess Taiping greatly and often discussed the affairs of the state with her.<ref>(后常谓"类我"。而主内与谋，外检畏，终后世无它訾。 ) New Book of Tang, vol. 83</ref>

In 688, after a failed rebellion against Empress Dowager Wu led by Emperor Gaozong's brother Li Zhen, Prince of Yue and Li Zhen's son Li Chong, Prince of Langye, Xue Yi, Xue Xu, and Xue Shao were discovered as having conspired with Li Chong.  Xue Yi and Xue Xu were beheaded, while Xue Shao was caned 100 times and starved to death — which led to more suffering, but which allowed his body to remain whole and thus was considered a more honorable death.

In 690, Empress Dowager Wu wanted to remarry Princess Taiping to Wu Youji, a grandson of Empress Dowager Wu's uncle Wu Shileng (武士稜).  Wu Youji, however, was already married, and Empress Dowager Wu secretly had Wu Youji's wife assassinated so that Princess Taiping could marry him.  With Wu Youji, Princess Taiping would have an additional two sons — Wu Chongmin (武崇敏) and Wu Chongxing (武崇行) — and one daughter.  A possible second daughter, titled Lady Yonghe (永和县主), was also born to them.

During Wu Zetian's reign: Increasing role in politics
Later in 690, Empress Dowager Wu had Emperor Ruizong yield the throne to her, establishing the Zhou dynasty with herself as its "emperor" (therefore interrupting the Tang dynasty).

In or before 697, Princess Taiping recommended Zhang Changzong to serve as Wu Zetian's lover.  Zhang Changzong further recommended his brother Zhang Yizhi as well.

Also in 697, Wei Suizhong (衛遂忠), a friend of the secret police official Lai Junchen, revealed that Lai had intended to accuse Princess Taiping, the Wu clan princes, Li Dan, and Li Zhe of treason.  Princess Taiping and the Wu clan princes, in response, accused Lai of crimes, and Wu Zetian put Lai to death.

In 699, when the chancellor Zong Chuke (a son of Wu Zetian's cousin) and Zong Chuke's brother Zong Jinqing (宗晉卿) were accused of corruption and exiled, Princess Taiping visited the Zongs' mansions and commented, "Once we look at their mansions, it is like we have not lived."

Also in 699, Wu Zetian, in fear that after her death that Li Zhe (who by now had changed his name to Li Xian and then further to Wu Xian and had been recalled to be crown prince again) and the Wu clan princes would not be able to coexist peacefully, had him, Li Dan, Princess Taiping, Wu Youji, and the other Wu clan princes swear an oath to each other and read the oaths to the gods.  The oaths were then carved on iron and kept in the imperial archives.

In 702, Wu Zetian had Li Xian, Li Dan, and Princess Taiping submit formal petitions to have Zhang Changzong created a prince.  She then formally rejected the petitions but created Zhang Changzong and Zhang Yizhi dukes.

In 703, a favorite official of Princess Taiping's, who might have been her lover, Gao Jian (高戩), was accused by the Zhangs of agreeing with the chancellor Wei Yuanzhong, whom the Zhangs had resented, that Wu Zetian was old and that it would be more secure to support the crown prince.  Wu Zetian, in anger, had Wei and Gao arrested and subsequently exiled.

During Emperor Zhongzong's second reign: Under Empress Wei's shadow
In 705, a coup led by the officials Zhang Jianzhi, Cui Xuanwei, Jing Hui, Huan Yanfan, and Yuan Shuji killed Zhang Yizhi and Zhang Changzong and overthrew Wu Zetian, restoring Li Xian to the throne. Princess Taiping was said to be involved in the coup, and after Emperor Zhongzong's restoration, he gave her the special title of Zhenguo Taiping Gongzhu (鎮國太平公主) — literally "the Princess Taiping who secured the state." He also established her own luxurious palace, and she enjoyed five thousand households, so she became very much rich, therefore, her power skyrocketed and she found a say in court politics. Later, Emperor Zhongzong specially sent a number of Imperial Army guards to be stationed at Princess Taiping's mansion. An imperial guard was set up around her mansion and there were also many fully armed guards patrolling day and night to protect her and protecting her was a lot like protecting the emperor.  This alone is enough to see Princess Taiping's exalted position in Emperor Zhongzong's reign. In 706, she, along with Emperor Zhongzong's daughters Princesses Changning, Anle (Li Guo'er), Yicheng, Xindu, and Ding'an, and Princess Jincheng (the daughter of Princess Taiping's nephew Li Shouli the Prince of Yong), were allowed to retain staffs, similar to imperial princes. As a result, they led a governmental structure, and the staffs and offices they held were part of a governmental mechanism and it was like setting up a government. She became one of the powerful women at court, although her power was rivaled by Emperor Zhongzong's wife Empress Wei and Li Guo'er. As a result, Princess Taiping with Empress Wei and Li Guo'er were engaged in party battles to seize power and eliminate each other.

After Emperor Zhongzong ascended the throne, Empress Wei and Li Guo'er dominated his reign and their lifestyle was completely promiscuous and extravagant, both tried to imitate Wu Zetian: The Empress Wei successfully imitated Empress Wu position during the reign of Emperor Gaozong, who listened to politics with a curtain at court next to the emperor, and effectively participating in both military and civil decisions, and the Li Guo'er brought chaos to his father's administration with rampant lawlessness and corruption, and in an unsuccessful attempt she tried to convince Emperor Zhongzong to make her crown princess; Both sold government posts, enslaved common people, executed anyone who insulted them or disobeyed their orders, and committed adultery with different men in the palace. Princess Taiping tried in vain to open Emperor Zhongzong's eyes to the activities of this mother and daughter, and her efforts were so unsuccessful that she rarely attended in the imperial palace for fear of their attack.

In 707, after Emperor Zhongzong's son Li Chongjun the Crown Prince, angry over Li Guo'er's repeated attempts to displace him to become crown princess, failed in a rebellion to arrest Empress Wei and Li Guo'er, Li Guo'er and Zong Chuke (now chancellor again) tried to implicate Princess Taiping and Li Dan in Li Chongjun's plot, Emperor Zhongzong requested Xiao to investigate, but after Xiao Zhizhong spoke on their behalf, weeping, responded:

 

Emperor Zhongzong stopped investigations against Princess Taiping and Li Dan. From this time on, Princess Taiping with Li Longji spent time to cultivate relationships with some imperial guard commanders, and she began to attract a some of middle-ranking officials around her. As a result, she expand her power to compete with Empress Wei and Princess Anle and their faction, and sought to protect herself and her brother Li Dan.

 During Empress dowager Wei's regency: A coup against her 
Emperor Zhongzong died suddenly in 710 — a death that traditional historians believed to be a murder carried out by Empress Wei and Li Guo'er so that Empress Wei could become emperor and Li Guo'er could become crown princess. In the aftermath of Emperor Zhongzong's death, Empress Wei, who initially kept the death secret, tried to consolidate power; she immediately ordered that the palace and the capital be sealed. All the gates were blockaded and exit of the capital forbidden, and summoned the  her allied officials into the palace, and mobilized a total of 50,000 soldiers from various prefectures to be stationed in Chang'an City, and immediately put Wei Wen in overall command of the imperial guards, with his cousin Wei Xuan (韋璿) and nephews Wei Bo (韋播) and Gao Song (高嵩) in command as well. But Emperor Zhongzong's death was discovered by Princess Taiping faster than Empress Wei wanted to secure her power, and Princess Taiping and another powerful woman, Emperor Zhongzong's concubine Consort Shangguan Wan'er, drafted a will on Emperor Zhongzong's behalf that attempted to balance the various factions — having Emperor Zhongzong's son by another concubine, Li Chongmao the Prince of Wen, take the throne, and having Empress Wei as empress dowager and regent, assisted by Li Dan. This performance of Princess Taiping angered Empress Wei and her clan and faction. Immediately, Empress Wei's cousin Wei Wen, wanting to have Empress Wei take sole power, however, modified the will to remove Li Dan as coregent.  Accordingly, Li Chongmao took the throne (as Emperor Shang), while Empress Wei became empress dowager and regent. The foiling of Princess Taiping's plan terrified her and her followers, prompting them to wage a carefully planned war against Empress Dowager Wei and her powerful clan and faction.

Meanwhile, Empress Dowager Wei's clan members, along with Zong Chuke, Li Guo'er's husband Wu Yanxiu (武延秀), and other officials Zhao Lüwen (趙履溫) and Ye Jingneng (葉靜能) were advising her to take the throne, like Wu Zetian did, and they also advised her to eliminate Li Dan and Princess Taiping.  The official Cui Riyong leaked their plan to Li Dan's son Li Longji the Prince of Linzi.  Li Longji responded by conspiring with Princess Taiping, Princess Taiping's son Xue Chongjian, as well as several low level officials close to him — Zhong Shaojing, Wang Chongye (王崇曄), Liu Youqiu, and Ma Sizong (麻嗣宗) — to act first.  Meanwhile, Empress Wei's nephews Wei Bo (韋播) and Gao Song (高嵩), who had recently been put in command of imperial guards and who had tried to establish their authority by dealing with the guards harshly, had alienated the guards, and the guard officers Ge Fushun (葛福順), Chen Xuanli (陳玄禮), and Li Xianfu (李仙鳧) thereafter also joined the plot.

Under the full planning and some command actions of Princess Taiping (such as financing, gathering opposition political and military forces against Empress Dowager Wei, joining the army to attack the palace, and carefully preparing how to attack), without first informing Li Dan, the conspirators (under the joint leadership of Princess Taiping and Li Longji) rose on 21 July, first killing Wei Bo, Gao, and Empress Wei's cousin Wei Gui (韋璿).  They then attacked the palace. Li Longji rushed directly into the heart of the enemy with 10,000 armed soldiers, and looked for Empress Dowager Wei and Li Guo'er. When Empress Dowager Wei panicked and fled to an imperial guard camp, a guard beheaded her.  Li Guo'er, Wu Yanxiu, and Lady Helou were killed as well.  Li Longji soon slaughtered a number of officials in Empress Dowager's faction as well as her clan, while displaying Empress Dowager Wei's body on the street.  Thereafter, at the urging of Princess Taiping, Li Longji, and Li Longji's brother Li Chengqi the Prince of Song, Li Dan retook the throne. In fact, no one dared to praise or propose Li Dan as emperor, Princess Taiping did it first, and Princess Taiping summoned the courtiers and decided to transfer power from Emperor Shang to Li Dan and she was bold enough to told all the officials:  she also tell the little emperor:  Princess Taiping grabbed Emperor Shang's collar at the replacement ceremony and lowered him while he was still sitting on the throne, reducing Li Chongmao back to the title of Prince of Wen, and she ordered his arrest. She took Li Dan's hand and placed him on the throne, and following her actions, Li Longji also expressed his support and guaranteed his father reign.

 During Emperor Ruizong's second reign: Ruling an empire 
After Emperor Ruizong returned to the throne, she was awarded the unprecedented title of Zhenguo Taiping Gongzhu Wanhou (鎮國太平公主万侯) — literally "the Princess Taiping who secured the state and has the obedience of all." Against this backdrop, the following edict was issued in the name of Ruizong to reward Princess Taiping with additional households of income: 

The edict, together with the reward, was a part of the complicated negotiation at the heart of the delicate alliance between Li Longji and Princess Taiping. On its surface, the throne was using this edict to reward Princess Taiping; in reality, Princess Taiping was one of the real powerholders behind the throne, and her agency permeated every part of the imperial decision making. Indeed, the edict acknowledged, in the emperor's voice, that Princess Taiping supported "Us" as the emperor. In other words, the edict publicly proclaimed a version of history that featured Princess Taiping as the agent who rescued the empire and pacified the realm.

He particularly and blindly trusted Princess Taiping and was completely favor to her, and she became honored like an empress inside the palace and court. She discussed and helped decide all military and state affairs: every time that an official made a proposal, report and petition, he directed the official to first discuss the matters with Princess Taiping and Li Longji (who was created crown prince), before he would rule on the matter himself. Thus, Princess Taiping has decision-making power on many events in the governmental and border matters. She can often decide the promotion or demotion of officials with a single sentence. According to Song dynasty historian Sīmǎ Guāng 司马光 in the Zizhi Tongjian:

Her three sons were all created princes (in Xue Chongjian's case, the Prince of Lijie). She became extremely rich and lucrative, and she was known as a real force behind the throne, as a result of her power, and her mansion was like a palace, even more magnificent, and her palace, like the emperor's palace, was guarded by soldiers: her staff simulated the royal design without any reservations, and most chancellors, forbidden troops, officials and warlords were her associates. Therefore, the Princess Taiping was so powerful that she even surpassed Emperor Ruizong. Also, Princess Taiping would sit behind a curtain beside Emperor Ruizong and give him advice during imperial meetings, and discussing affairs of dynasty and state with his councilors, who took orders from her while she sat behind a screen (as an imitation of her mother and sister-in-law, when they were both empress consort).

The historian Liu Xu, in Old Book of Tang, was highly critical of the power Princess Taiping had wielded, it says:  

According to Song dynasty historians Ouyang Xiu and Song Qi, in the New Book of Tang: 

Initially, Princess Taiping agreed to Li Longji's ascension as crown prince despite the fact that Li Longji was not Emperor Ruizong's oldest son and was not born of Emperor Ruizong's wife, the deceased Empress Liu (Li Chengqi was both — and therefore pursuant to Confucian principles of succession should have been crown prince, although Li Chengqi himself declined the title, reasoning that Li Longji's accomplishment was what allowed the empire to be secure), as she believed that Li Longji was young (25 at the time he was made crown prince) and would be easy to control and therefore maintain her power for the future (if one day he sits on the throne).  However, once she began to see that Li Longji was strong-willed, and especially after she realized Li Longji was not receptive to her influence, she became apprehensive and often had officials close to her publicly opine that Li Longji was an improper crown prince. She further often paid Li Longji's staff members to spy on him to try to find faults with him.  She associated with a group of officials, including the chancellors Dou Huaizhen, Xiao Zhizhong, and Cen Xi, intending to find some way to remove Li Longji, but was unable to get two other chancellors — Wei Anshi and Song Jing — to join her group. On one occasion, when Emperor Ruizong met with Wei Anshi alone, he told Wei, "I have heard that the officials are all loyal only to the Eastern Palace [(i.e., the Crown Prince, as the Eastern Palace was the residence for the crown prince)].  You should investigate this."  Wei responded:

Emperor Ruizong was surprised and took no further action and only said:  

However, Princess Taiping Was behind a pearl screen behind Emperor Ruizong and heard this, and she spread rumors against Wei, hoping that he would be arrested and tried, but the chancellor Guo Yuanzhen stopped the investigations into Wei. In another case, of course, this time directly by herself, When she hinted that Li Longi should be replaced at a meeting she had with the chancellors, the other chancellors all did not dare to speak, but chancellor Song directly responded:

In 711, Song and another chancellor, Yao Yuanzhi, tried to persuade Emperor Ruizong to carry out a plan that they believed would end her plotting.  They proposed that the two princes who arguably had superior claims on the throne than Li Longji — Li Chengqi and Li Shouli (whose father Li Xian (note different character than Emperor Zhongzong) was an older brother to both Emperors Zhongzong and Ruizong) — be sent out of the capital Chang'an to serve as prefectural prefects, while Princess Taiping and Wu Youji be sent to live in Luoyang.  They also proposed that Li Longji be put in charge of most affairs of state.  Emperor Ruizong initially agreed and made the orders as Song and Yao suggested, except that he believed that Luoyang was too far and therefore sent Princess Taiping and Wu Youji only to Pu Prefecture (蒲州, roughly modern Yuncheng, Shanxi).  After Princess Taiping found out that the plan was conceived by Song and Yao, however, she was incensed and let Li Longji know her anger.  In fear, Li Longji submitted a petition accusing Song and Yao of alienating him from his brothers Li Chengqi and Li Shouli (who was actually a cousin but was raised with Emperor Ruizong's sons) and aunt Princess Taiping, asking that the two be put to death.  Emperor Ruizong, in response, demoted Song and Yao and recalled Princess Taiping, Li Chengqi, and Li Shouli to the capital.  After Song and Yao were removed, Princess Taiping further suggested that a major reform in the civil service system that they carried out — removing officials improperly commissioned during Emperor Zhongzong's reign — be reversed, and Emperor Ruizong agreed. That year, Princess Taiping persuaded Emperor Ruizong to decree, collect and compile Shangguan Wan'er works, and retain the works of this talented woman. Later that year, in order to please Wu Youji, Princess Taiping requested that the tombs of Wu Zetian's parents Wu Shihuo (武士彠) and Lady Yang be restored to imperial tomb status (they had been reduced to the status of tombs of nobles after Emperor Zhongzong's death), and Emperor Ruizong agreed.  Also that year, when the officials Xue Qianguang (薛謙光) and Murong Xun (慕容珣) accused an associate of Princess Taiping's, the Buddhist monk Huifan (慧範), Princess Taiping pleaded on Huifan's behalf, and Emperor Ruizong, believing that Xue and Murong had only accused Huifan because they could do so during the time that Princess Taiping was out of the capital, demoted Xue and Murong.

In winter 711 Princess Taiping's has become more powerful, and because of her recommendations, Emperor Ruizong carried out a major reorganization of his administration, relieving the chancellors Wei, Guo Yuanzhen, Dou, Li Rizhi, and Zhang Shuo of their chancellor positions, instead commissioning a number of chancellors that she recommended — Liu Youqiu, Wei Zhigu, Cui Shi, and Lu Xiangxian.  (Cui was a lover of Princess Taiping, and when she offered to recommend him as chancellor, because he admired Lu, he requested to be made chancellor along with Lu, even though Lu was not an associate of Princess Taiping. It was said that Emperor Ruizong, however, was initially unwilling to make Cui chancellor, but relented after Princess Taiping begged in tears, although the account may be somewhat discountable in that neither Liu nor Wei was an associate of Princess Taiping either, and both were close associates of Li Longji.) The governors general of the Imperial Guards, Chang Yuankai (常元楷), Li Ci (李慈), and Li Qin was also loyal to her.

In 712, Princess Taiping's husband Wu Youji died, and Emperor Ruizong posthumously created him the Prince of Ding, a title that he had formerly carried.

Later that year, Princess Taiping had astrologers warn Emperor Ruizong that the constellation that symbolized the imperial throne, Dizuo (帝座), showed that there would be a change in the emperor's position — believing that Emperor Ruizong would suspect Li Longji of plotting a coup and that she could remove Li Longji this way. She pointing out that history was repeating itself; Emperor Taizong (grandfather of Princess Taiping and Emperor Ruizong), his father overthrew Emperor Gaozu in a coup (Xuanwu Gate Incident). Instead, Emperor Ruizong, reasoning that the change in the emperor's position could be accounted by an orderly transition, offered to pass the throne to Li Longji.  Princess Taiping fervently opposed it, and Li Longji initially declined, but at Emperor Ruizong's insistence finally accepted and took the throne (as Emperor Xuanzong).  However, at Princess Taiping's suggestion, Emperor Ruizong retained more of the imperial power as Taishang Huang (retired emperor). She told him:  Therefore, his edicts continued to carry very much greater and valid force than Emperor Xuanzong's; Even the new emperor had to obey his rulings.

During Emperor Xuanzong's reign: Power struggle in court
After Emperor Ruizong became Taishang Huang (retired emperor), meanwhile, Princess Taiping continued to be highly extremely influential in governmental matters through Emperor Ruizong, and still most chancellors, forbidden troops, officials and warlords were her associates. (Of the seven chancellors at the time, five – Dou Huaizhen, Xiao Zhizhong, Cen Xi, Cui Shi, and Lu Xiangxian – were made chancellors at her recommendation, although Lu was not considered a member of her party.) As a result, she retained the supreme hand, so the power struggle between aunt and nephew intensified. According to Song dynasty historian Sīmǎ Guāng 司马光 in the Zizhi Tongjian:

Later in 712, Liu Youqiu and the general Zhang Wei (張暐), with approval from Emperor Xuanzong, planned to command the imperial guards to kill Princess Taiping's associates, but when Zhang discussed this with the censor Deng Guangbin (鄧光賓), Deng leaked the news.  Once the leak was known, Emperor Xuanzong was forced to disavow the plan and further inform Emperor Ruizong.  Liu, Zhang, and Deng were arrested, but after Emperor Xuanzong pleaded on their behalf, they were only exiled.

By 713, it was said that Princess Taiping, Dou Huaizhen, Cen Xi, Xiao Zhizhong, Cui Shi; along with other officials Xue Ji, Li Jin (李晉) the Prince of Xinxing (a grandson of Li Deliang (李德良), a cousin of Tang's founder Emperor Gaozu), Li You (李猷), Jia Yingfu (賈膺福), Tang Jun (唐晙); the generals Chang Yuankai (常元楷), Li Ci (李慈), and Li Qin (李欽); and the monk Huifan, were plotting to overthrow Emperor Xuanzong.  It was further said that they discussed, with the lady in waiting Lady Yuan to poison the gastrodia elata that Emperor Xuanzong routinely took as an aphrodisiac.  When this alleged plot was reported to Emperor Xuanzong by Wei Zhigu, Emperor Xuanzong, who had already received advice from Wang Ju (王琚), Zhang Shuo, and Cui Riyong to act first, did so.  He convened a meeting with his brothers Li Fan (李範) the Prince of Qi, Li Ye (李業) the Prince of Xue, Guo Yuanzhen, along with a number of his associates — the general Wang Maozhong (王毛仲), the officials Jiang Jiao (姜皎) and Li Lingwen (李令問), his brother-in-law Wang Shouyi (王守一), the eunuch Gao Lishi, and the military officer Li Shoude (李守德) — and decided to act first.  On 29 July, Emperor Xuanzong had Wang Maozhong take 300 soldiers to the imperial guard camp to behead Chang and Li Ci.  Then, Jia, Li You, Xiao, and Cen were arrested and executed as well.  Dou fled into a canyon and committed suicide by hanging.  Xue Ji was forced to commit suicide.  When Emperor Ruizong heard about this, he quickly ascended the tower at Chengtian Gate (承天門) to ascertain what was happening.  Guo reported to him Emperor Xuanzong's intentions, and Emperor Ruizong felt compelled to affirm Emperor Xuanzong's actions in an edict.  The next day, Emperor Ruizong issued an edict transferring all authorities to Emperor Xuanzong and moved to a secondary palace, Baifu Hall (百福殿).

Meanwhile, Princess Taiping, hearing what happened to her associates, fled into a temple in the mountains, only appearing three days later.  Emperor Xuanzong ordered her to commit suicide at home, and put to death her sons and associates, except for Xue Chongjian, who had often counseled Princess Taiping against retaining power and who had often been battered by her — Emperor Xuanzong bestowed on Xue Chongjian the imperial surname of Li and allowed him to retain his titles.  Princess Taiping's assets were confiscated, and it was said that there was so much treasure, livestock, and real estate that it took several years for the accounting to be complete.

In fiction and popular culture
 Portrayed by Chen Hong and Zhou Xun in Palace of Desire (2000)
 Portrayed by Zheng Shuang in Secret History of Empress Wu (2011)
 Portrayed by Zheng Shuang and Alyssa Chia in Secret History of Princess Taiping (2012)
 Portrayed by Kristy Yang in Women of the Tang Dynasty (2013)
 Portrayed by Alice Chan in Deep in the Realm of Conscience (2018)

 Ancestry 

 Notes 

 References 
 Citations 

 Sources 

 Old Book of Tang, vol. 183.
 New Book of Tang, vol. 83.
 Zizhi Tongjian'', vols. 202, 204, 206, 207, 208, 209, 210.

Tang dynasty politicians
Tang dynasty princesses
Tang dynasty Taoists
7th-century births
713 deaths
Suicides in the Tang dynasty
Women leaders of China
Forced suicides of Chinese people
Executed Tang dynasty people
8th-century executions by the Tang dynasty
665 births
Wu Zetian
Daughters of emperors